The Jerky Boys: The Movie, also known as The Jerky Boys, is a 1995 American crime/comedy film starring Johnny Brennan and Kamal Ahmed, best known as the comedy duo the Jerky Boys.

The film features two men, Johnny B. and Kamal, aka "the Jerky Boys", two self-described "low-lifes from Queens", who get into trouble with the Mafia when one of their prank calls leads them into a money laundering business. The Jerky Boys discover that their long-loved hometown bar will be torn down unless they stop their shenanigans.

Plot

The film opens in a New York police station as a pair of "low-lifes from Queens" named Johnny B. and Kamal are taken into police custody and interrogated by an NYPD detective named Robert Worzic. Worzic demands to know exactly how the pair got into their situation, so Johnny explains that for the past twenty years, he and Kamal frequently entertained themselves by performing prank calls on the telephone. He brings up an early call where he got his neighbor Brett Weir, the local goody-two-shoes kid, in trouble with his mother by impersonating an angry citizen and claiming that Brett has been spitting and cursing.

One day twenty years later (the beginning of the film's present day), Johnny and Kamal are adults and still performing prank calls, but Johnny's mother Mrs. B demands that they get jobs. Johnny argues that they get fired from everything they try, even though their reason for termination usually stems from their inability to not insult people over radios and intercoms. Mrs. B compares them to Brett Weir, who has grown to live a very successful life and now owns his own house, and tells them to get out of the house and job-hunt.

Johnny and Kamal decide to head to Mickey's, their local bar, and knock back a few drinks placed on their sizable tab. They happen to meet Brett, who buys them drinks and brags that he is on his way to a meeting at a fancy restaurant. Curious, Johnny calls Brett's new friends at the restaurant as "Frank Rizzo" and tells the people on the other end (in no polite terms) that "his men" Johnny and Kamal have just gotten in from Chicago and need to be cared for. Unbeknownst to the pair, Brett's friends are actually the local Mafia run by Ernie Lazzaro, who is confused and bewildered at "Rizzo" and his vulgarity but nonetheless gives the boys a limousine ride and a fully comped meal.

Feeling that they have stumbled onto a good job, Johnny calls again as "Rizzo" the next day and demands another good time for him and Kamal. This time, Lazzaro and his right-hand man Tony Scarboni introduce the pair to the many Mafia leaders and officials on their payroll. They are given money as an advance on their first assignment: beat up Mickey so the mob can take over his bar and tear it down. At this point, the boys realize what they are in and that they are in deep. As they try (and fail) to convince Mickey to lay low, Brett recognizes them and reveals to Lazzaro that they are not mobsters at all. Scarboni's men Geno and Sonny later grab Johnny and Kamal and takes them to a hot dog-processing plant so that Scarboni can run them through the grinder as punishment. Using their vocal talents, the boys distract their captors and escape. Johnny and Kamal lead Scarboni and his men through the city, crashing a local concert, stealing a cab, and wrecking a nightclub magic show along the way. They eventually make it back to Johnny's house in Queens, only to get arrested by Worzic for all the trouble they caused.

Returning to the present situation, Johnny and Kamal insist to Worzic that everything was just a big misunderstanding and try to tell him of Lazzaro's many rackets in the city. Worzic, however, only cares about "Frank Rizzo" (who apparently is an actual Mafia boss that he wants arrested) and throws the boys in a jail cell. They are each given one phone call: Johnny calls his mother, who is threatened by Scarboni to tell them where he is, while Kamal calls a local demolition crew. They are later released on bail and picked up by Scarboni's men so that they can take them to Lazzaro and Scarboni, who are now fitting Mrs. B with cement shoes. Johnny insists that "Frank Rizzo" can set everything straight and calls his house, where he had previously set up a tape-recording of "Rizzo" to play on the answering machine. Though it seems to work well enough to make Lazzaro brag about his operation, Brett sees through the deception and the rest of the mob chase after the boys and Mrs. B.

Barely making it back to Queens, Johnny and Kamal immediately call Worzic and tells them that they have taped evidence to incriminate Lazzaro. Instead, the detective is revealed to be on the take (explaining his prior refusal to help) and joins Lazzaro in chasing the boys, but they are distracted when Lazzaro recognizes the next-door neighbor Uncle Freddie as a Mafia boss from long ago. This gives the boys the chance to escape downtown and call every news outlet they can think of with their evidence that exposes Lazzaro. They credit "Frank Rizzo" as the informant, who in turn credits Johnny and Kamal as "The Jerky Boys".

Lazzaro, Scarboni, Worzic, and all their accomplices are arrested, while Johnny and Kamal are made heroes and given a cushy office job in a high-rise building. Not surprisingly, they start off by prank calling the White House and demanding to know who's in charge. Meanwhile, Brett Weir has just gotten out of prison after making a deal with prosecutors, only to see his house getting torn down by the demolition crew that the Jerky Boys had called earlier.

Characters
Johnny — himself, one of the two prank callers.
Kamal — himself, one of the two prank callers.
Ernie Lazzaro — (Alan Arkin) a powerful mob boss whom the prank callers get tangled up with.
Tony Scarboni — (Vincent Pastore) Lazarro's right-hand man.
Geno — (Brian Tarantina) Scarboni's bumbling underling.
Sonny — (Peter Appel) Scarboni's bumbling underling.
Robert Worzic — (Brad Sullivan) a detective who is trying to bring a fictional "Frank Rizzo" down
Brett Weir — (James Lorinz) Johnny's weaselly mob-connected neighbor. A victim to the Jerky Boys.
Mrs. B — (Suzanne Shepherd) Johnny's long-suffering mother.
Uncle Freddy — (William Hickey)  Johnny's Neighbor, seemingly a harmless old kook but really an old-time mob boss
Mickey — (Alan North) Owns the bar Johnny B. and Kamal frequent.
Construction Foreman — (Joe Lisi) a construction worker, who fires Johnny and Kamal.
Burger Bob Customer — (Ron Ostrow) a customer ordering lunch at Burger Bob's drive through.
Band Manager — (Ozzy Osbourne) band manager for Helmet.
Henry Bogdan — (Himself) one of the four members of Helmet.
Rob Echeverria — (Himself) one of the four members of Helmet.
Page Hamilton — (Himself) one of the four members of Helmet.
John Stanier — (Himself) one of the four members of Helmet.

Production and delay of release
In 1993 after the release of the first Jerky Boys album, it was announced producers Joe Roth and Roger Birnbaum's production company Caravan Pictures had negotiated a deal with Johnny B. and Kamal for a proposed Jerky Boys film .
Roth signed the duo to a movie deal after listening to a Jerky Boys tape brought in by Jonathan Glickman, who at the time was a USC student interning at Caravan. Roth loved it, signed the Boys to a movie deal, and soon thereafter made Glickman a junior exec at Caravan. Roth said of the film:

The film was shot between April and June 1994 in New York City, under the direction of James Melkonian.  The project's distributor, Buena Vista, originally planned to release the film in 1994 but the release was delayed until after the release of the second Jerky Boys album. The film was released theatrically on February 3, 1995 by Buena Vista through its Touchstone Pictures label.  The copyright date of this movie is 1994 and the same date appears on the disc and back cover of the soundtrack.

Home media
The Jerky Boys was initially released by Touchstone Home Video on VHS on March 5, 1996. A widescreen LaserDisc was also released by Touchstone Home Video. The first (and only) release on DVD was in March 2004 in Europe and the United Kingdom. The Jerky Boys movie became available for streaming via iTunes and Amazon, as of early 2012.

Reception
The film received mostly negative reviews. On review aggregator website Rotten Tomatoes, the film holds an approval rating of 9%, based on 11 reviews, and an average rating of 1.4/10. Being a significant part of the Jerky Boys' career, it has a cult following among Jerky Boys fans, which Johnny Brennan discussed at length on his late podcast.

References

External links
 
 
 
 

1995 films
Touchstone Pictures films
Caravan Pictures films
1990s crime comedy films
American comedy thriller films
Films scored by Ira Newborn
Films produced by Joe Roth
Films produced by Roger Birnbaum
Mafia comedy films
1995 comedy films
1990s English-language films
1990s American films